This is a list of windmills in the English county of North Yorkshire.

York

Other locations

Maps
1772 T Jeffereys
1775 Jackson
1829 A Bryant
1855 Ordnance Survey

Notes

Mills in bold are still standing, known building dates are indicated in bold. Text in italics denotes indicates that the information is not confirmed, but is likely to be the case stated.

Sources
Unless otherwise indicated, the source for all entries is:- or the linked Windmill World page.

References

History of Yorkshire
Windmills in North Yorkshire
Lists of windmills in England
Windmills